USS R. W. Wilmot (SP-604) was a United States Navy patrol vessel in commission from January to April 1918.

R. W. Wilmot was built as a commercial steam tug of the same name by Globe Iron Works, Cleveland, Ohio, in 1898. On 4 January 1918, the U.S. Navy acquired her from her owner, the River and Ocean Towing Company of Wilmington, Delaware, for use as a section patrol boat during World War I. She was commissioned on 26 January 1918 as USS R. W. Wilmot (SP-604).

Assigned to the 5th Squadron, Patrol Force, United States Atlantic Fleet, R. W. Wilmot operated in the Mid-Atlantic and southern New England area until 9 March 1918.  Selected for "distant service," she departed the United States on 17 March 1918 bound for France. After her arrival there she was simultaneously decommissioned and transferred to the government of France on 4 April 1918.

References

SP-604: R. W. Wilmot at Department of the Navy Naval History and Heritage Command Online Library of Selected Images: U.S. navy Ships -- Listed by Hull Number "SP" #s and "ID" #s -- World War I Era Patrol Vessels and other Acquired Ships and Craft numbered from SP-600 through SP-699 
NavSource Online: Section Patrol Craft Photo Archive R. W. Wilmot (SP 604)

Patrol vessels of the United States Navy
World War I patrol vessels of the United States
Ships built in Cleveland
1898 ships
Ships transferred from the United States Navy to the French Navy